The Lexington Bluegrass Bandits were an American soccer team that played in Lexington, Kentucky.

They joined the USISL in 1994, and moved to the USISL Pro League in 1995.  They were relegated to the USISL Premier League the next year.

Year-by-year

References

Soccer clubs in Kentucky
USISL teams
Defunct Premier Development League teams
Association football clubs established in 1994
Association football clubs disestablished in 2000
1994 establishments in Kentucky
2000 disestablishments in Kentucky
Sports in Lexington, Kentucky